Andrew of Caesarea (AD 563–614) was a Greek theological writer and bishop of Caesarea in Cappadocia. Karl Krumbacher assigned him to the first half of the sixth century. He is variously placed by other scholars, from the fifth to the ninth century. However, today it is unquestionable that his life spanned the late sixth/early seventh centuries.

Works 

His principal work is a commentary on the Book of Revelation (Patrologia Graeca vol. 106, cols. 215–458 and 1387–94) and is the oldest Greek patristic commentary on that book of the Bible. The very first Greek commentary on Revelation may barely predate Andrew's work and is attributed to Oikoumenios. “Oikoumenios” is not a recognized Father of the Church. Therefore, Andrew of Caesarea's work is correctly identified as the earliest Greek patristic commentary on the Apocalypse. Most subsequent Eastern Christian commentators of the Book of Revelation have drawn heavily upon Andrew and his commentary, which was preserved in nearly 100 complete Greek manuscripts, as well as translation in Armenian, Georgian, and Slavonic manuscripts. Andrew's most important contribution was that he preserved many existing Eastern traditions associated with Revelation, both oral and written. His commentary was so influential that it preserved a specific text type for Revelation, known as the Andreas type.

An unpublished study of the work, including an English translation, was made as a thesis by Dr. Eugenia Constantinou in 2008. The English translation of Andrew's commentary has been published by Catholic University of America Press as part of the Fathers of the Church series and became available in November 2011. In 2011 the Catholic University of America published Dr. Constantinou's study as Commentary on the Apocalypse (Fathers of the Church Patristic Series) In 2013 the Catholic University of America published Dr. Constantinou's study as Guiding to a Blessed End: Andrew of Caesarea and His Apocalypse Commentary in the Ancient Church Dr. Constantinou's original 2008 PhD thesis, Quebec: Université Laval 508 page manuscript is available from theses.ulaval.ca as a pdf  Andrew of Caesarea and the Apocalypse in the Ancient Church of the East

See also 
 Minuscule 2814

External links 

 Guiding to a Blessed End: Andrew of Caesarea and His Apocalypse Commentary in the Ancient Church, Eugenia Scarvelis Constantinou, The Catholic University of America Press, 2013.
 Andrew of Caesarea, Commentary on the Apocalypse, translated by Eugenia Scarvelis Constantinou, Fathers of the Church series, Catholic University of America Press, volume 123, 2011. This book also contains an extensive and informative introduction to the person of Andrew and the commentary.
 Eugenia Constantinou, Andrew of Caesarea and the apocalypse in the ancient church of the East: Studies and Translation. PhD thesis, Quebec: Université Laval (2008)

References 

Attribution
Much of what is provided in the Catholic Encyclopedia online version is outdated and incorrect.
Use that reference with caution.

 

Byzantine theologians
6th-century Byzantine bishops
Greek-language writers
563 births
637 deaths
6th-century Byzantine writers
6th-century Christian theologians
7th-century Byzantine bishops
7th-century Byzantine writers
7th-century Christian theologians